Cripplebush Creek is a small stream that flows into Schoharie Creek north of Central Bridge, New York.

References

Rivers of New York (state)
Rivers of Schoharie County, New York